The 2014 World Senior Curling Championships will be held from April 23 to 30 at the Dumfries Ice Bowl in Dumfries, Scotland. The event will be held in conjunction with the 2014 World Mixed Doubles Curling Championship.

Men

Round-robin standings
Final round-robin standings

Playoffs

Bronze-medal game
Wednesday, April 30, 12:30

Gold-medal game
Wednesday, April 30, 12:30

Women

Round-robin standings
Final round-robin standings

Playoffs

Bronze-medal game
Wednesday, April 30, 12:30

Gold-medal game
Wednesday, April 30, 12:30

References

External links

World Senior Curling Championships
2014 in curling
2014 in Scottish sport
International curling competitions hosted by Scotland